San Diego County Credit Union (SDCCU) is an American financial services company headquartered in San Diego, California. The credit union is San Diego's largest locally owned financial institution and the fifteenth largest credit union in the U.S by total assets. SDCCU was founded in 1938 as San Diego County Employees Credit Union and was formed to provide for the financial needs of local county government employees. During the 1970s, San Diego County Employees Credit Union changed its name to San Diego County Credit Union and expanded its membership to include all San Diegans. Today, SDCCU is open to people living or working throughout Southern California: Imperial, Los Angeles, Orange, Riverside, San Bernardino, San Diego, San Luis Obispo, Santa Barbara or Ventura counties.

SDCCU is a financial cooperative with no external stockholders. It has over 425,000 members and 43 branch offices in its service area. Its deposits are insured by the National Credit Union Administration and it is an equal housing lender.

Services 
San Diego County Credit Union offers the typical suite of account services provided by most financial institutions, including savings accounts, checking accounts, IRA accounts and certificates. SDCCU also offers members consumer loans, auto loans, credit cards and home mortgages.

SDCCU offers online and mobile services via its corporate website. Customers also have access to CO-OP Network locations at other credit unions, Costco, 7-Eleven stores and other ATMs.

References

Credit unions based in California
Companies based in San Diego
Banks established in 1938
1938 establishments in California